Wilson is an unincorporated community in Cabell County, West Virginia, United States.

References

Unincorporated communities in Cabell County, West Virginia
Unincorporated communities in West Virginia